Soroako, also spelled Sorowako, is a small mining town in the north-east of South Sulawesi province, in the centre of Sulawesi island in Indonesia.
It is the location of the Sorowako Mine, which is the largest open-pit mine in Indonesia, owned by PT Inco, a subsidiary of the Canadian based mining company Vale Inco.

Geography
It is located in the Verbeek mountains, Soroako is surrounded by three natural lakes: Lake Matano, Lake Towuti and Lake Mahalona.
Matano Lake is the deepest lake in Indonesia.

Matano Lake is surrounded by ring of small mountain rock. The weather sometimes can be very severe, often with thunder and lightning storms. Small earthquakes are common as well. Almost every year in December - January, a strange phenomenon occurs in the center of Matano Lake. A large tornado appears to stand still in the middle of the lake and remains there for a short time.  Seen from shore the tornado looks to have a diameter of approximately 10 meters.  While the tornado is standing still above the lake a cloud comes down to the surface of the lake and then seems to come up again through the funnel of the tornado.

The source of Matano Lake is believed come from an area west of the lake that the native people call  Matano village. In this area one can sometimes see white-bellied sea eagle.

People
Most of Soroako's residents work as employees for the mining company PT. Vale Indonesia, Tbk. (before PT. Inco). They come to Soroako from all over Indonesia. The rest of the population work primarily as farmers or fishermen.
In the mountain side on the west side of town there is a natural cave that remains largely unexplored. Near the entrance is a chamber full of hundreds of skeletons that some say are the remains of a rebel force (PKI) from the 1950s and others claim is actually a native cemetery (similar to the cemetery caves of Tanah Toraja).

References

Populated places in South Sulawesi